Jeho-tang is a traditional Korean cold drink made with honey and several ingredients used in traditional Korean medicine. The ingredients include omae ("smoked unripe plums"), sain ("medicinal cardamom"), baekdanhyang ("white sandalwood"), and chogwa ("black cardamom"). The powdered ingredients are mixed together with honey and water and then boiled. After the liquid is chilled, it is diluted in cold water. It was considered the best summer drink in Korean royal court cuisine.

See also 
 Hwachae (punch)
 Sikhye (rice punch)
 Ssanghwa-tang (medical tea)
 Sujeonggwa (cinnamon punch)

References

Herbal tea
Korean tea
Traditional Korean medicine
Korean royal court cuisine